Lizbeth Marano (born 1950) is an American artist and photographer. Her work is included in the collections of the Whitney Museum of American Art and the Princeton University Art Museum.

References

External links
Official website

1950 births
Living people
20th-century American artists
20th-century American women artists
21st-century American photographers
21st-century American women